Chocolats Halba is a Swiss chocolate producer based in Pratteln (Basel-Landschaft). It is owned by the Coop group and is essentially sold through their supermarkets. The annual production is about 20,000 tons of chocolate.

History 
The company was founded on May 5, 1933, by Willy Hallheimer and Werner Baer in Zurich as Halba AG. Hallheimer contributed 18,000 francs of the 30,000 francs start-up capital and gave Baer a pledged loan of 12,000 francs for his share. Production started in Baer's apartment with four employees. In 1955 the company moved to Wallisellen. Halba has been producing for Coop since 1960. In 1967, the two manufacturers Käppeli and SpoSa (formerly Spoerry and Schaufelberger AG, Wald Zürich) were taken over. In 1968, Coop acquired a share of Halba, and in 1972 it took over Halba completely. At the end of 2000, production moved from Wald Zürich to Hinwil. Since 2003 the company is called Chocolats Halba and since 2004 it became only a division of Coop.

In 2013, Chocolats Halba Honduras AG was founded as the first branch in a developing country.

In 2017, Chocolats Halba moved into its new production facility in Pratteln, near Basel, on the Areal Salina Raurica site. The previous locations in Wallisellen and Hinwil were abandoned. In September 2017, Chocolats Halba was merged with the Coop Sunray division. The new company was named Chocolats Halba / Sunray. Chocolats Halba / Sunray is a member of IG Bio.

Company 
Coop owns 75 percent of Chocolats Halba S.A. de C.V. in San Pedro Sula, Honduras.

Awards 
On April 28, 2018, Chocolats Halba received the Swiss Ethics Award for the "Sustainable Chocolate from Ecuador" project. The joint project by Chocolats Halba and Coop pursues ecominic, ecological and social goals: e.g. the increase in living standards, biodiversity and the integration and promotion of young farmers.

References

External links
Official website

Companies established in 1933
Swiss chocolate companies
Swiss brands
Brand name chocolate
Food and drink companies established in 1933
Basel-Landschaft